Gorodishche is a rural locality (a village) in Dobryansky District, Perm Krai, Russia. The population was 11 as of 2010. There are 12 streets.

Geography 
Gorodishche is located 48 km south of Dobryanka (the district's administrative centre) by road. Pyaty km is the nearest rural locality.

References 

Rural localities in Dobryansky District